Oenomaus ortygnus, the aquamarine hairstreak, is a species of butterfly of the family Lycaenidae. It is found from Brazil through Central America to Tamaulipas, Mexico. Rare strays may be found up to southern Texas. The habitat consists of low elevation wet and dry tropical forests.

The wingspan is 30–38 mm. The upperside is blue with black borders and the underside is gray with a pink sheen. There are no submarginal or postmedian lines. There are three or four black spots on the hindwings. Adults are on wing from January to November in Mexico.

The larvae feed on Annona species. They bore into and feed upon the buds, flowers and fruits of their host plant.

References

Butterflies described in 1779
Eumaeini
Lycaenidae of South America